Darmstadt is first single from the Ruoska album, Riisu.

Origin of song name
In an interview, Patrik Mennander said the name Darmstadt (which is a city in Germany) and the chorus "Darmstadt - Road to heaven" originates from a dream former band guitarist Kai Ahvenranta had, in which he saw a sign saying "Darmstadt - Road to heaven", which inspired the song.  He later remembered seeing the name Darmstadt on the wheels of a vehicle being used while he was working in the timber industry.

Track listings
 "Darmstadt"
 "Airut"

References

External links
 Additional information (in Finnish)
 "Darmstadt" lyrics
 "Airut" lyrics

Ruoska songs
2003 singles
2003 songs
Song articles with missing songwriters